Ronald Joel Glasser (May 31, 1939 – August 26, 2022) was an American doctor and author, best known for his book 365 Days, chronicling his tour of duty as a US Army doctor during the Vietnam War. He was born in Chicago, Illinois.

Published in 1971, the book became a best-seller. It was reviewed in the Washington Monthly and the New York Times. 365 Days has been translated into nine languages.

In June 2006, Glasser, a Minneapolis physician, published his seventh book, Wounded: Vietnam to Iraq. In his foreword, Glasser writes:

Glasser died at the age of 83 on August 26, 2022, in St. Louis Park, Minnesota, from complications of dementia.

Works
365 Days (1971). G. Braziller. .
Wounded: Vietnam to Iraq (2006). G. Braziller. .
Ward 402 (1973) G. Braziller. .
Broken Bodies Shattered Minds: A Medical Odyssey From Vietnam to Afghanistan (2011). History Publishing. 
The Body Is the Hero (1976). Bantam Books.
Another War, Another Peace (1985). Summit Books.
The Greatest Battle (1976). Random House.
The Light In the Skull: An Odyssey of Medical Discovery (1997). Faber & Faber.

References

External links
Ronald J. Glasser

1939 births
2022 deaths
American male writers
Military personnel from Illinois
Physicians from Chicago
Writers from Chicago